In chemistry, hypomanganate, also called manganate(V) or tetraoxidomanganate(3−), is a trivalent anion (negative ion) composed of manganese and oxygen, with formula .  

Hypomanganates are usually bright blue. Potassium hypomanganate  is the best known salt, but sodium hypomanganate , barium hypomanganate , and the mixed potassium-barium salt  is also known.   The anion can replace phosphate  in synthetic variants of the minerals apatite<ref name=Dardenne>K. Dardenne, D. Vivien, and D. Huguenin (1999): "Color of Mn(V)-substituted apatites A10((B, Mn)O4)6F2, A = Ba, Sr, Ca; B= P, V". Journal of Solid State Chem.istry, volume 146, issue 2, pages 464-472. </ref> and brownmillerite.

History
The manganate(V) anion was first reported in 1946 by Hermann Lux, who synthesized the intensely blue sodium hypomanganate by reacting sodium oxide  and manganese dioxide  in fused sodium nitrite  at 500 °C.  He also crystalized the salt from strong (50%) sodium hydroxide solutions as the decahydrate ·10.

Structure and properties
Manganate(V) is a tetrahedral oxyanion structurally similar to sulfate, manganate, and permanganate.  As expected for a tetrahedral complex with a d2 configuration, the anion has a triplet ground state.

The anion is a bright blue species with a visible absorption maximum at wavelength λmax = 670 nm (ε = )..

Stability
Hypomanganate is unstable towards disproportionation to manganate(VI) and manganese dioxide:  The estimated electrode potentials at pH 14 are:.
MnO + e−  MnO   E = +0.27 V
MnO + e− +   MnO2 +    E = +0.96 V
However, the reaction is slow in very alkaline solutions (with OH− concentration above 5–10 mol/L.

The disproportionation is believed to pass through a protonated intermediate, with the acid dissociation constant for the reaction HMnO  MnO + H+ being estimated as pKa = . However, K3MnO4 has been cocrystallized with Ca2Cl(PO4), allowing the study of the UV–visible spectrum of the hypomanganate ion..

Preparation
Hypomanganates may be prepared by the careful reduction of manganates with sulfite, hydrogen peroxide or mandelate.

Hypomanganates can also be prepared by the solid state method under  flow near 1000 °C.  They can be prepared also via low temperature routes such as hydrothermal synthesis or flux growth. It is produced by dissolving manganese dioxide in molten sodium nitrite.

Uses
The strontium vanadate fluoride  compound, with hypomanganate substituted for some vanadate units, has been investigated for potential use in near infrared lasers.

The barium salt  has interesting magnetic properties.

Related compounds
In theory, hypomanganate would be the conjugate base of hypomanganic acid .  This acid cannot be formed because of its rapid disproportionation, but its third acid dissociation constant has been estimated by pulse radiolysis techniques:
HMnO  MnO + H+   pK''a = 

Cyclic esters of hypomanganic acid are thought to be intermediates in the oxidation of alkenes by permanganate.

See also

 Dimanganite, a manganate(III) anion 
 Manganate or manganate(VI), 
 Permanganate or manganate(VII),

References

Manganese(V) compounds
Transition metal oxyanions